Gorp is a hamlet in the municipality of Hilvarenbeek, in the south of the Netherlands near its border with Belgium.  Once historically separate from Hilvarenbeek, it has become a de facto neighborhood of the larger town.

Gorp was the birthplace of physician, linguist, and humanist Johannes Goropius Becanus (1519-1572), whose Latinized surname is derived from the town's name.

Populated places in North Brabant
Hilvarenbeek